The 1985 Virginia Slims of Houston was a women's tennis tournament played on outdoor clay courts  in Sugar Land, Houston, Texas in the United States that was part of the Category 3 tier of the 1985 Virginia Slims World Championship Series. It was the 15th edition of the tournament and was held from April 28 through May 5, 1985. First-seeded Martina Navratilova won the singles title.

Finals

Singles
 Martina Navratilova defeated  Elise Burgin 6–4, 6–1
 It was Navratilova's 6th singles title of the year and the 105th of her career.

Doubles
 Elise Burgin /  Martina Navratilova defeated  Manuela Maleeva /  Helena Suková 6–1, 3–6, 6–3

References

External links
 ITF tournament edition details

Virginia Slims of Houston
Virginia Slims of Houston
Virginia Slims of Houston
Virginia Slims of Houston
Virginia Slims of Houston
Virginia Slims of Houston
Virginia Slims of Houston